John Brown (born 1838, date of death unknown) was a United States Navy sailor and a recipient of the United States military's highest decoration, the Medal of Honor.

A native of Denmark, Brown immigrated to the U.S. and joined the Navy from Maryland. For this action, he and his shipmates, Seaman Richard Bates and Seaman Thomas Burke, were awarded the Medal of Honor three months later, on August 1.

Brown's official Medal of Honor citation reads:
For heroic conduct with 2 comrades, in rescuing from drowning James Rose and John Russell, seamen, of the U.S.S. Winooski, off Eastport, Maine, 10 May 1866.

See also

List of Medal of Honor recipients in non-combat incidents

References

External links

1838 births
Year of death missing
Danish emigrants to the United States
United States Navy sailors
United States Navy Medal of Honor recipients
Foreign-born Medal of Honor recipients
Non-combat recipients of the Medal of Honor